Franklin is a transfer station between the Line 2 and Line 6 of the Santiago Metro. Their namesake is the Franklin Neighborhood. The Line 2 station was opened on 31 March 1978 as the southern terminus of the inaugural section of the line, from Los Héroes. On 21 December 1978, the line was extended to Lo Ovalle. The Line 6 station was opened on 2 November 2017 as part of the inaugural section of the line, between Cerrillos and Los Leones.

The station has a central mezzanine on the first level down containing turnstiles and a ticket booth. Stairs at the two northernmost corners of the mezzanine provide access to the platform level, whereas at south end of the mezzanine, one stair per platform go up to it.

A passageway connects the mezzanine's east end to the only access to the station. The original entrance pavilion was replaced by the current more modest structure. It features two parallel escalators, one up and the other down,  which are separated by a central unused space that is provisioned to accommodate two additional escalators. The escalators are flanked by two staircases.

Gallery

References

Santiago Metro stations
Railway stations opened in 1978
Santiago Metro Line 2
Santiago Metro Line 6